Maximiliano Díaz may refer to:

 Maximiliano Díaz (athlete), Argentine athlete
 Maximiliano Díaz (footballer), Argentine footballer